26 Boötis is a single star in the northern constellation of Boötes, located 188 light years away from the Sun. It is visible to the naked eye as a dim, yellow-white hued star with an apparent visual magnitude of 5.91. This object is moving closer to the Earth with a heliocentric radial velocity of −16.5 km/s.

This is an F-type subgiant star with a stellar classification of F2 IV, which suggests it has exhausted the supply of hydrogen at its core and is in the process of evolving into a giant. It is an estimated 1.6 billion years old with 1.46 times the mass of the Sun and 2.43 times the Sun's radius. The star is radiating 11.6 times the Sun's luminosity from its photosphere at an effective temperature of 6,826 K. The rotation rate is moderately high, with a projected rotational velocity of 56 km/s. 26 Boötis is a known source of radio emission.

References

F-type subgiants
Boötes
Durchmusterung objects
Bootis, 26
127739
071115
5434